Rashidabad (also Romanized as Rashīdābād; also known as Rashīdābād-e ‘Olyā) is a village in Galehzan Rural District, in the Central District of Khomeyn County, Markazi Province, Iran. At the 2006 census, its population was 290, in 78 families.

References 

Populated places in Khomeyn County